The Carlisle City General Hospital was a health facility in Fusehill Street, Carlisle, Cumbria, England. It is a Grade II listed building.

History
The facility has its origins in the Carlisle Union Workhouse which was designed by Henry Lockwood and William Mawson and was completed in 1863. It became a military hospital at Easter 1917 during both the First World War and then served as a military hospital again during the Second World War. It joined the National Health Service as the Carlisle City General Hospital in 1948. After services transferred to the new Cumberland Infirmary, it closed in 1999. It was subsequently converted to become  St Martin's College and evolved to become the Carlisle campus of the University of Cumbria.

References 

1863 establishments in England
Hospitals established in 1863
Hospital buildings completed in 1863
Hospitals in Cumbria
Defunct hospitals in England
Grade II listed buildings in Cumbria